The 2003–04 season was the 107th season of competitive football in Scotland.

League Competitions

Scottish Premier League

The 2003–04 Scottish Premier League season was won by Celtic with 98 points, 17 points ahead of closest challengers Rangers. Both Rangers and Celtic therefore gained the two UEFA Champions League places and Hearts got the UEFA Europa League place having finished third. Partick Thistle were relegated to the Scottish First Division, this however was decided by a tribunal as at the time Inverness's stadium did not meet the criteria for the SPL, as with Falkirk the previous season, however unlike Falkirk the SPL decided that Inverness were allowed to share a ground with Aberdeen.

Scottish First Division

Scottish Second Division

Scottish Third Division

Other honours

Cup honours

Individual honours

SPFA awards

SFWA awards

Scottish clubs in Europe

Summary

Average coefficient – 7.375

Rangers

Celtic

Hearts

Dundee

Scotland national team

Key:
 (A) = Away match
 (H) = Home match
 ECQG5 = European Championship Qualifying – Group 5
 EFQPO = European Championship Qualifying – Play-off

Deaths
1 February: Ally MacLeod, 72, Scotland national team manager (1977–78).
12 February: Leonard Dudman, 70, Falkirk and Forfar Athletic winger.

See also
2003–04 Celtic F.C. season
2003–04 Dundee United F.C. season
2003–04 Rangers F.C. season

Notes and references

 
Seasons in Scottish football

no:Skotsk Premier League 2003–2004